Aleksander Väinö Nyström (11 September 1857 - 31 January 1918) was a Finnish civil servant, bank director and politician, born in Ruovesi. He was a member of the Parliament of Finland from 1909 to 1910, representing the Finnish Party. A few days after the beginning of the Finnish Civil War, being a prominent supporter of the White faction, he was arrested by Red Guards and shot in Pirkkala on 31 January 1918.

References

1857 births
1918 deaths
People from Ruovesi
People from Häme Province (Grand Duchy of Finland)
Finnish Party politicians
Members of the Parliament of Finland (1909–10)
People of the Finnish Civil War (White side)
Deaths by firearm in Finland